Saša Teofanov (born 3 April 1990) is a Serbian football midfielder.

References

External links
 Stats at Utakmica.rs
 
 

1990 births
Living people
Sportspeople from Pančevo
Association football midfielders
Serbian footballers
Serbian SuperLiga players
FK Rad players
FK Radnički Pirot players
FK Zemun players
FK Dinamo Pančevo players
FK Donji Srem players
FK Sinđelić Beograd players